Sigglesthorne is a small village and civil parish in the East Riding of Yorkshire, England.

According to the 2011 UK census, Sigglesthorne parish had a population of 404, an increase on the 2001 UK census figure of 282.

The village has around 175 houses. There is also an ancient church dedicated to St. Lawrence that was designated a Grade II* listed building in 1966 and is now recorded in the National Heritage List for England, maintained by Historic England.
There is also a Church of England school.

It is rumoured throughout the village that the settlement was given its name as a result of a Viking who lived there. This Viking leader was supposedly called Siggle/Siggul, and since hawthorne is the predominant type of hedge around the village, it was given the name "Siggul's thorne" → Sigglesthorne.

Hornsea Road in Sigglesthorne is now the home to a large garden centre named Hornsea Garden Centre.

References

External links

Villages in the East Riding of Yorkshire
Civil parishes in the East Riding of Yorkshire
Holderness